Jasna Šamić (born 1 April 1949) is a Bosnian and French writer, author of books (poetry, novels, short stories, essays, research work, theater plays) written both in the French and Bosnian language.

Biography
Jasna Šamić was born on 1 April 1949 in Sarajevo, FPR Yugoslavia (modern-day Bosnia and Herzegovina), where she graduated from elementary school and high school (Sarajevo High school -lyceum- and Conservatory - School of music, and from the University of Sarajevo, where she studied oriental languages and literatures, Turkish, Arabic and Persian; also University of Sarajevo: Third Cycle or Post-graduated Thesis in General Linguistics and Turkology, PHD degree at The Faculty of Philosophy of Sarajevo in 1977; at the University of Paris – Sorbonne Nouvelle, she did the Thesis of National Doctorate (Doctorat d' Etatès Lettres) in 1984, on Sufism and History.

Started as an Assistant and Assistant Professor at the Faculty of Philosophy in Sarajevo, she was Professor of Oriental Literatures at the same Faculty, University of Sarajevo, 1988–1992 (she was expelled from the Faculty without reason). She was also Director of Research associated to the CNRS (French National Centre of Research) in 1992, and Professor of Languages, Literatures, History and Civilisation of the Balkans at the University Marc Bloch of Strasbourg; 2000–2002. 
She collaborated with French radio programs: Radio France Internationale, 1986–1993; France Culture, 1992–1996.

In Sarajevo, Jasna Šamić was Director of the literary Revue «Književna riječ», Sarajevo (1973), Vice President of the Department of Oriental Studies at the Faculty of Philosophy, 1980–1984; Vice President of the Union of Translators of Bosnia and Herzegovina (1982–1985); Member of the Reading Panel or Editorial Board in the Veselin Masleša, publishing house, Sarajevo (until 1992); Member of the Editorial Board of the Revue «Kulture Istoka», Belgrade (until 1992).

She is Member of The Asian Society (Sociétéasiatique), Paris, from 1984, Member of the Union of Writers of Bosnia, from 1974, Member of the international PEN Club, Bosnia and Herzegovina, from 2006, Member of the Union of Writers of France, from 1996, member of the international PEN Club of France.

She collaborated at revues in former Yugoslavia and Europe; she participated at International Conferences in Paris, Munich, Belgrade, Istanbul, Princeton, Philadelphia, Strasbourg, Venice, Jerusalem, Bamberg, Vienna, Tel Aviv, Berlin, Tunis, Sarajevo, etc. She gave Lectures at the Universities of former Yugoslavia (until 1992); University of Utrecht (1993); University of Strasbourg for the III cycle students of Turkology and History (2000–2003); University of Grenoble (2000); University of Brussels (2006); French Culture Centre of Luxembourg (2005), The Senate, in Paris (2007). 
Director of a literary review Književna sehara (www.balkan-sehara.com)

Jasna Šamić is a winner of the Stendhal French Literary Prize (Lauréate du programme Missions Stendhal) in 2008.and Literary Prize Gauchez- Pillippot 2014, winner of Prize of Public at the Balkans Book Fair (Salon du livre des Balkans), Paris 2018, winner of international Naji Naaman Honorary Prize for all of her work in 2018, winner of several bosnian literary prizes, namely those of the Publishing Foundation (Fodancija za izdavaštvo), Bosnia, 2015 - 2018... 
She gave Interviews in different countries (for example at France Culture, France Inter, RFI, Belgium TV, Austrian TV, French TV and radios, etc.). Bosnian TV dedicated to her a 55 minutes broadcast (2001).

Since 1977, Jasna Šamić has been living between Sarajevo and Paris, but since the war in the Balkans of 1992–1995, mostly in Paris, now as a freelance writer.

In 2017, Jasna Šamić has signed the Declaration on the Common Language of the Croats, Serbs, Bosniaks and Montenegrins.

Works

In French 
Jasna Šamić, "Dîvan de Ķaimî: Vie et œuvre d'un poéte bosniaque du XVIIe siècle", Synthèse no. 24 (Paris: Institut Français d'Etudes Anatoliennes, Editions Recherche sur les Civilisations, 1986). Pp. 280.
 Jasna Šamić, Le pavillon bosniaque: novel, Dorval editions, 1996
Jasna Šamić, "Bosnie Pont des Deux Mondes", 1996
Jasna Šamić, "Histoire inachevée, (short stories)", éd. de l’Oeil sauvage, Bayonne, 1996. 
Jasna Šamić, "L’Amoureux des oiseaux (poetry and short stories)", Bf édition, Strasbourg, 2006. 
Jasna Šamić, "Portrait de Balthazar", novel, M.E.O., Bruxelles, 2012; Gauchez-Philippot Price.
Jasna Šamić, "L'Empire des ombres", novel, Publibook, Paris, 2013.
Jasna Šamić, "Le givre et la cendre", (novel), M.E.O, Briuxelles, 2015;
Jasna Šamić, "Trois histoires un destin", (pièces de théâtre), Harmattan, 2016.
Jasna Šamić, "Dans le lit d'un rêve", M.E.O., Bruxelles, 2017
Jasna Šamić, "Les contrées des âmes errantes", M.E.O., Bruxelles, 2019.
Jasna Šamić, "Chambre avec vue sur l'océan" (novel); translated from Bosnian by the autor with G.Adam, M.E.O.,2020.
Jasna Šamić, "Ailleurs est le ciel", poetry, l'Harmattan, Paris,2022.

In Bosnian :
Jasna Šamić, "Isjećeni trenuci (poetry)", Svjetlost, Sarajevo, 1973.
Jasna Samic, "U hladu druge kože (poetry)", V. Masleša, Sarajevo, 1980.
Jasna Šamić, "Iz bilježaka Babur Šaha (poetry)", Svjetlost, Sarajevo, 1986.
Jasna Šamić, "Junus Emre", Glas, Banja Luka, 1990 ;
Jasna Šamić, "Pariški ratni dnevnik", (essay), ENES, Istanbul, 1994 ; 
Jasna Šamić, "Sjećanje na život", (theater), Vodnikova domačija, Ljubljana, 1995 ;
Jasna Šamić, "Grad ljubav smrt", (theater), Vodnikova domačija, Ljubljana, 1995 ;
Jasna Šamić, "Mraz i pepeo", (novel), Bosanska knjiga, Sarajevo, 1997 ;
Jasna Šamić, "Valcer", (short stories), Media press, Sarajevo, 1998 ; 
Jasna Šamić, "Antologija savremene francuske knjizevnosti (Anthologie de la littérature française contemporaine;translation and preface of the author's)", Zid, Sarajevo, 1998 ;
Jasna Šamić, "Bosanski paviljon", (novel), Svjetlost, Sarajevo 2000 ; 
Jasna Šamić, "Soba s pogledom na okean", (novel), Tesanj, 2001 ;
Jasna Šamić, "Pariz Sarajevo 1900", (monographia), Meddia press, Sarajevo, 2001 ; 
Jasna Šamić, "Portret Balthazara Castiglionea", (novel), Rabic, Sarajevo, 2002. 
Jasna Šamić, "Drame (theater)", Bosanska rijec, 2006 
Jasna Šamić, "Carstvo sjenki" (novel), Zoro, Sarajevo-Zagreb, 2007
Jasna Šamić, "Na Seni barka", (short stories), Bosanska rijec, 2008
Jasna Šamić, "Mistika i mistika", (essay), Plima, Cetinje, 2010.
Jasna Šamić, "Mozart" (novel), Sahinpasic, Sarajevo, 2013
Jasna Šamić, "Mistika i mistika"(essay), Buybook, Sarajevo, 2014;
Jasna Šamić "Na postelji od sna" (poetry), Bosnia and Herzegovina Publishing Award Foundation, Dobra knjiga, Sarajevo, 2015
Jasna Šamić "Predjeli lutajućih duša" (novel, first part of the trilogy, Bosnia and Herzegovina Publishing Award Foundation, Planjax, 2017
Jasna Šamić "Carstvo sjenki", (novel) Factum, Beograd, 2018
Jasna Šamić "Svjetlo mraka" (poetry) Dobra knjiga, Sarajevo, 2018
Jasna Šamić, "Deveti val", (novel) Cetinje: OKF; Beograd: Factum izdavaštvo; Sarajevo: Buybook, 2018.
Jasna Šamić "Medo prekinuo seosku idilu", (children's books) with illustrations by Mario Mikulić, (RABIC, Sarajevo, 2018)
Jasna Šamić "Noć je opet na pragu postelje ti", (poetry) Planjax, 2020;
Jasna Šamić "Razbijeni kaleIdoskop", (novel), Rabic, Sarajevo,2021.
Jasna Šamić "Nesretan slučaj", (novel), Factum, Belgrade, 2022.
Jasna Šamić "Atelje na broju 19", (novel), Rabic, Sarajevo, 2022.

Films :
 Les Nakshibendis de Visoko, documentary, 1986.
 Où sont les Bektâchî de Bosnie ?, documentary,1986.
 Une ville l’amour la mort, documentary – production "Festival de toutes les cultures", Paris, 1995.
 1900 Sarajevo Paris, documentary, production TV Bosnia and Herzégovina, 2000. 
 L’Artiste et son gâteau, short, 2004.
 Bonjour mon amour, j’ai seize ans, short, 2005.
 Promenade, short; 2007. 
 Quo vadis 68 Paris Sarajevo, documentary May 68, 60', coproduction FTV and Festival « Sarajevska zima »
 Coucher auprès du ciel – un souvenir mis en images, documentary, IPI, Parimages, ASJA, Paris 2010
 A number of documentaries for Bosnian TV, TVSA 2013 -2015

Theater direction

 Iz biljezaka Babur Saha; Pozoriste mladih, Sarajevo, 1987 (published in Iz Biljezaka Babur Saha, Svjetlost, 1986).
 Souvenir d’une vie (Memory of a lifetime), Proscenium Theatre, Paris, 1996 (published in DRAMA, Bosanska Rijec, Wuppertal-Tuzla 2007).
 Meeting (Susret), SARTR, Sarajevo, 1998 (published in Drama, Bosanska Rijec, Wuppertal-Tuzla 2007).
 Double Exile (Dvostruki exil), Sarajevo, 1999.
 Call (Telefonski poziv) (based on the short story of Jasna Samic, published in Valcer, Media press, Sarajevo), Kamerni teatar 55, Sarajevo 1999.
 Avant que n’apparraisse le Messager de la Mort, The festival "Bascarsijske noci 2007, Muzej Knjizevnosti - Mak, Sarajevo, 2000 (published in l’Amoureux des oiseaux, bilingual, Bf éditions, Strasbourg, 2007).
 Miniatures, Bosnjacki Institute, Sarajevo, 2008.
 D’un Soleil à l’autre (From one sun to the other one), Maison du Patrimoine, L’Haÿ - les-Roses, 2009.
 Theater " L’aire Falguière", Paris, 2009.
 Anniversaire, text and direction by Jasna Samic, Bar de l’Industrie, Montreil, Paris, 2011 ; 
 Portrait de Balthazar, text and direction by Jasna Samic, Maison des associations, Paris, 2012; 
 Les souvenirs plus lourds que le roc, text and direction by Jasna Samic, Théâtre de Syldavie, Maisons d’Europe et d’Orient, Paris, 2014

References

 Jasna Samic, Anniversaire

External links
Interview: Samic
http://www.sildav.org/pdf/QUOVADIS.pdf

1949 births
Living people
Signatories of the Declaration on the Common Language
Writers from Sarajevo
Bosnia and Herzegovina emigrants to France
University of Sarajevo alumni
Academic staff of the University of Sarajevo
21st-century French dramatists and playwrights